The Ballade No. 1 in G minor, Op. 23 is a ballade for solo piano by Frédéric Chopin. Completed in 1835, it is one of Chopin's most popular works. A typical performance lasts nine to ten minutes.

History 

The ballade dates to sketches Chopin made in 1831, during his eight-month stay in Vienna. It was completed in 1835 after his move to Paris, where he dedicated it to Baron Nathaniel von Stockhausen, the Hanoverian ambassador to France.

In 1836, Robert Schumann wrote: "I have a new Ballade by Chopin. It seems to me to be the work closest to his genius (though not the most brilliant). I even told him that it is my favourite of all of all his works. After a long, reflective pause he told me emphatically: 'I am glad, because I too like it the best, it is my dearest work.'"

Structure 

The piece begins in the first inversion of the A major chord, a Neapolitan chord, which implies a majestic aura, ending in a dissonant left-hand chord D, G, and E that is not resolved until later on in the piece. Though Chopin's original manuscript clearly marks an E as the top note, the chord has caused some degree of controversy, and thus, some versions of the work – such as the Klindworth edition – include D, G, D as an ossia.

The main section of the ballade is built from two main themes. The brief introduction fades into the first theme in G minor, introduced at measure 8. After dramatic development, the second theme in E major is introduced softly at measure 68. The exposition is once again followed by development, in which the two themes, transferred to another tonal center (A minor and A major), undergo transformation. Then, a reprise presents the two themes in their original keys, albeit in reverse order.

A thundering chord introduces the coda, marked Presto con fuoco, to which the initial Neapolitan harmony re-emerges in constant dynamic forward propulsion, which eventually ends the piece in a fiery double octave scale run down the keyboard.

As a whole, the piece is structurally complex and not strictly confined to any particular form, but incorporates ideas from mainly the sonata and variation forms. A distinguishing feature is its time signature. While the other three ballades are written in strict compound duple time with a  time signature, Ballade No. 1 bears deviations from this. It is also considered one of Chopin's most technically and musically demanding works.

In popular culture 
The ballade has featured prominently in several films. It is performed on-screen in Gaslight by the Polish pianist Jakob Gimpel, credited as the Pianist. A performance of the piece is central to the plot of the 2002 Roman Polanski film The Pianist, where it moves a German officer to hide and supply with food the pianist, Władysław Szpilman, played by Adrien Brody. On the soundtrack, it is played by Janusz Olejniczak. It also appears in the 1991 film Impromptu, where Chopin is playing this piece when he is interrupted by George Sand and meets her for the first time.

In 2010, the British journalist Alan Rusbridger (the editor of The Guardian) dedicated a year to learning Ballade No. 1 and produced a book about the experience, Play It Again: An Amateur Against the Impossible.

The piece was also the subject of the 2013 Channel 4 documentary Chopin Saved My Life. It is quoted in Mieczysław Weinberg's Symphony No. 21 ("Kaddish").

After Chopin's death, the Belgian violinist and musician Eugène Ysaÿe made his own arrangement of Ballade No. 1 for violin and piano. That arrangement was used as the soundtrack for the final episode of the Japanese anime Your Lie in April in 2014–2015.

Japanese figure skater and two-time Olympic champion Yuzuru Hanyu skated his short program to Ballade No. 1 in four seasons between 2014 and 2020. The program has earned him four world records and contributed to the win of his second Olympic title such as the completion of the first career Super Slam in the men's singles discipline. As of December 2021, Hanyu's Ballade No. 1 has set the five highest short program scores across all judging systems and is the most successful program in that competition segment.

References

Further reading
 
Berger, Karol (Summer 1996). "The Form of Chopin's 'Ballade,' Op. 23." 19th-Century Music, vol. 20, no. 1, pp. 46–71.
Rothstein, William (1994). "Ambiguity in the Themes of Chopin's First, Second, and Fourth Ballades." Intégral, vol. 8, pp. 1–50.

External links

 Ballade No. 1 played by Josef Hofmann
 Ballade No. 1 played by Alfred Cortot
 Ballade No. 1 played by Benno Moiseiwitsch
 Ballade No. 1 played by Arthur Rubinstein
 Ballade No. 1 played by Vladimir Horowitz
 Ballade No. 1 played by Claudio Arrau
 Ballade No. 1 played by Sviatoslav Richter
 Ballade No. 1 played by Samson François
 Ballade No. 1 played by Arturo Benedetti Michelangeli
 Ballade No. 1 played by Martha Argerich
 Ballade No. 1 played by Krystian Zimerman

Compositions by Frédéric Chopin
1835 compositions
Compositions in G minor
Music with dedications
Piano ballades